Trailia is a genus of fungi in the family Halosphaeriaceae.

The genus was circumscribed by Georg Kenneth Sutherland in Trans. Brit. Mycol. Soc. vol.5 (1) on page 149 in 1915 and also New Phytologist vol.14 on page 193 in 1915.

The genus name of Trailia is in honour of James William Helenus Trail FRS FLS (1851–1919), who was a Scottish botanist who served as Professor of Botany at Aberdeen University from 1877 to 1919.

Species
As accepted by Species Fungorum;
 Trailia ascophylli 

Former species;
 Trailia buxi  = Puccinia buxi, Pucciniaceae family
 Trailia morthieri  = Puccinia morthieri, Pucciniaceae

References

External links
Trailia at Index Fungorum

Microascales